The Busan Open (formerly known as Busan Open Challenger Tennis) is a professional tennis tournament played on outdoor hard courts. It is currently part of the ATP Challenger Tour. It has been held annually in Busan, South Korea, since 2003.

Past finals

Singles

Doubles

References
Official website
South Korean Tennis Federation official website

 
ATP Challenger Tour
Hard court tennis tournaments
Tennis tournaments in South Korea
Recurring sporting events established in 2003
Sports competitions in Busan